The fourth principal meridian, set in 1815, is the principal meridian for land surveys in northwestern Illinois and west-central Illinois, and its 1831 extension is the principal meridian for land surveys in Wisconsin and northeastern Minnesota.  It is part of the Public Land Survey System that covers most of the United States.

The fourth principal meridian begins at a point on the west bank of the Illinois River in Schuyler County, Illinois.  The fourth principal meridian's baseline, sometimes called the Beardstown baseline, runs west from this initial point.  The meridian and this baseline governs surveys in Illinois that are west of both the Illinois River and the third principal meridian.

Extended
The meridian was extended north in 1831, through Wisconsin and northeastern Minnesota.  The extension uses the Illinois–Wisconsin border as its baseline, and is the basis of surveys in all of Wisconsin, as well as that part of Minnesota:
 east of the Mississippi River, and 
 some land west of the Mississippi River that includes the northern parts of Dakota and Scott Counties, and eastern Hennepin County, including all of Richfield, that part of Minneapolis south of 44th Ave. N., and the eastern half of the city of Bloomington, and
 all land east of the "third guide meridian, west of the fifth principal meridian," that is north of the Mississippi River from a point near the city of Aitkin. This line follows the western boundary of Aitkin County, then goes through the center of Itasca and Koochiching Counties.  This includes a portion of land west of the Mississippi River in Aitkin and Itasca Counties.

See also
List of principal and guide meridians and base lines of the United States
Public Land Survey System – United States survey system that established the meridians
Second principal meridian – used in eastern Illinois
Third principal meridian – used for most of central Illinois

References

External links

1815 establishments in the United States
1831 establishments in Illinois
Geography of Illinois
Geography of Minnesota
Geography of Wisconsin
Meridians (geography)
4
Geography of Schuyler County, Illinois